The Enola earthquake swarm was a series of earthquakes in 2001 that centered on Central Arkansas. It follows the earthquake swarms of Arkansas in the 1980s, and predates the Guy-Greenbrier earthquake swarm that started in 2010.

References

External links
Enola Swarm Area - Faulkner County, Arkansas from the Arkansas Geological Survey

Earthquake swarms